The following is a list of awards and nominations received by George Clooney.

Clooney is an American actor, singer, comedian, dancer, screenwriter, director, independent filmmaker, model and producer. Throughout his career, he has received eight Academy Award nominations, winning two—Best Supporting Actor for Syriana (2005) and as co-producer of Best Picture winner Argo (2012). Clooney is a 2022 Kennedy Center Honoree. He is one of only three people ever to have been nominated in six different Academy Award categories (Best Picture; Best Director; Best Original Screenplay; Best Adapted Screenplay; Best Lead Actor; Best Supporting Actor), following Walt Disney and later joined by Alfonso Cuarón. (This record has since been surpassed by Kenneth Branagh, who has been nominated in seven different categories.)

Clooney has received thirteen Golden Globe Awards winning four awards for his performances in O Brother Where Art Thou? (2000), Syriana (2005), and The Descendants (2011) as well for his producing Argo (2012). He also received the Golden Globe Cecil B. DeMille Award in 2015. 
Clooney has also received nine British Academy Film Award nominations, fourteen Screen Actors Guild Award nominations, and three Primetime Emmy Award nominations.

Major associations

Academy Awards

British Academy Film Awards

Golden Globe Awards

Primetime Emmy Awards

Screen Actors Guild Awards

Industry awards

Cinema for Peace

Empire Awards

MTV Movie & TV Awards

Satellite Awards

Saturn Awards

Miscellaneous

Notes

References

External links
 

Clooney, George